Zsela Thompson (born ), known mononymously as Zsela, is an American singer-songwriter. She self-released her Ache of Victory EP in 2020.

Personal life
She was born and raised in Brooklyn, New York. In 2021 she moved to Los Angeles, California.

Her father is musician Marc Anthony Thompson of Chocolate Genius, Inc. and her older sister is actress Tessa Thompson.

Discography

EPs
Ache of Victory (self-released, 2020) – produced by Daniel Aged
AOV (Remixes) <3 (2021)

Contributions
Karma & Desire (2020) by Actress – vocals on two tracks

References

External links

Musicians from Brooklyn
Singers from New York City
21st-century African-American women singers
1995 births
Living people